Habib Keïta (born 5 February 2002) is a Malian professional football player who plays for Belgian club Kortrijk on loan from Ligue 1 club Lyon.

Club career 
Habib Keïta joined Olympique Lyonnais Academy in October 2020, arriving from Mali, where he was in the same youth system as his Lyon teammate Sinaly Diomandé. His transfer fee was of €1 million, not including bonuses.

He made his professional debut for Olympique Lyonnais on the 8 May 2021, replacing Lucas Paquetá in a 4-1 home Ligue 1 win against FC Lorient.

For the 2022–23 season, Keïta joined Kortrijk in Belgium on loan.

References

External links

Olympique Lyonnais profile

2002 births
Living people
Malian footballers
Association football forwards
Olympique Lyonnais players
K.V. Kortrijk players
Ligue 1 players
Championnat National 2 players
Belgian Pro League players
Malian expatriate footballers
Malian expatriate sportspeople in France
Expatriate footballers in France
Malian expatriate sportspeople in Belgium
Expatriate footballers in Belgium
21st-century Malian people